This article shows all participating team squads at the 2013 FIVB Volleyball Men's World Grand Champions Cup.

The following is the Brazil roster in the 2013 FIVB Volleyball Men's World Grand Champions Cup.

The following is the Iran roster in the 2013 FIVB Volleyball Men's World Grand Champions Cup.

The following is the Italy roster in the 2013 FIVB Volleyball Men's World Grand Champions Cup.

The following is the Japan roster in the 2013 FIVB Volleyball Men's World Grand Champions Cup.

The following is the Russia roster in the 2013 FIVB Volleyball Men's World Grand Champions Cup.

The following is the United States roster in the 2013 FIVB Volleyball Men's World Grand Champions Cup.

References

G
FIVB Men's Volleyball World Grand Champions Cup squads